Odd Sverre Lovoll (born October 6, 1934) is a Norwegian-American author, historian and educator.

Background
Odd Sverre Lovoll was born in Sande, in Møre og Romsdal, Norway. He immigrated to the United States in 1946 and is a naturalized United States citizen. Lovoll  graduated from the University of North Dakota (M.A. 1969) and from  the University of Minnesota (Ph.D. 1973).

Career
He served on the faculty of the University of Minnesota from 1967 to 1970. For thirty years, Lovoll  served  on the faculty of St. Olaf College. He retired from the King Olav V Chair in Scandinavian-American Studies at St. Olaf College in 2000. Lovoll continues a part-time appointment in History at the University of Oslo. From 1980 until 2001 he served as publication editor for The Norwegian-American Historical Association. In that capacity he edited and supervised publication articles mainly on Norwegian-American and Scandinavian-American immigration. He has been published in both Norway and the United States.

Personal life
In 1958 Lovoll married Else Navekvien. They have two children: Audrey born 1960 and Ronald born 1963. Audrey has two children, and Ronald has three, all of which are mentioned in dedication pages in a number of his written works. Lovoll was decorated with the Knight's Cross First Class of the Royal Norwegian Order of Merit in 1986 by Olav V of Norway. In 1989 he was inducted into membership in The Norwegian Academy of Science and Letters. He was inducted into the Scandinavian Hall of Fame at the 2001 Norsk Høstfest.

Selected works
A Folk Epic: The Bygdelag in America (1975) 
The Promise of America : a History of the Norwegian-American people (1983) 
A Century of Urban Life : the Norwegians in Chicago before 1930 (1988) 
The Promise Fulfilled : a Portrait of Norwegian Americans today (1998) 
Norwegians on the Prairie : Ethnicity and the Development of the Country Town (2006)
Norwegian newspapers in America : connecting Norway and the new land  (2010)
Across the deep blue sea : the saga of early Norwegian immigrants  (2015)
Two Homelands : A Historian Considers His Life and Work  (2018)

References

1934 births
Living people
People from Sande, Møre og Romsdal
Writers from Minnesota
Historians from Minnesota
20th-century Norwegian historians
University of Oslo alumni
University of North Dakota alumni
University of Bergen alumni
University of Minnesota alumni
Norwegian emigrants to the United States
Members of the Norwegian Academy of Science and Letters
University of Minnesota faculty
St. Olaf College faculty
21st-century Norwegian historians